Thomas Villadsen (born 4 September 1984) is a Danish retired professional footballer who played as a goalkeeper and works as goalkeeper coach of Lyngby BK

Biography
Villadsen started in Vanløse IF, and played there until the junior age. He moved to Farum Boldklub, but here were two good keepers on the junior team. He moved on to Kjøbenhavns Boldklub (KB), the reserve team of top-flight Danish Superliga club F.C. Copenhagen. In his time at KB, he was called up for the Danish under-20 and under-21 squads, but served as an unused back-up to Kevin Stuhr Ellegaard.

He served as F.C. Copenhagen's third choice goalkeeper after Magnus Kihlstedt and Benny Gall, while playing in the KB team which won promotion to the Danish 2nd Division in 2005. He signed a full-time contract with F.C. Copenhagen starting April 2006, and continued to play for KB, even scoring a penalty kick goal in a 6–0 win against Greve Fodbold. He played his only competitive game for F.C. Copenhagen in the 2006 Viasat Cup, and was an unused part of the F.C. Copenhagen first-team squad in the championship-winning 2006–07 Superliga season.

As his contract ended in the summer 2007, he signed a contract with the Dutch club FC Emmen in the second-tier Eerste Divisie. In his first season with the club, Villadsen was voted both Eerste Divisie goalkeeper of the year and the FC Emmen player of the year. He did not play any league games for the club, before he moved to Romanian club Ceahlăul Piatra Neamţ in February 2010.

Coaching career
In February 2016, HB Køge signed a contract with DanKeepers DK, which was professional goalkeeper coaching, which was co-owned by Villadsen. Villadsen worked at the club as a coach until the summer of 2018. He worked at HB Køge while he also played for Nykøbing FC.

After retiring, Villadsen became the goalkeeper coach of Lyngby Boldklub. The deal was announced on 7 January 2019.

Honours
Ceahlăul Piatra Neamț
Liga II: 2010–11

References

 Nykøbing gafler Villadsen, bold.dk, 9 February 2016

External links

Danish Superliga statistics

 Thomas Villaddsen Interview

1984 births
Living people
Danish men's footballers
Association football goalkeepers
Vanløse IF players
Kjøbenhavns Boldklub players
F.C. Copenhagen players
FC Emmen players
CSM Ceahlăul Piatra Neamț players
FC Nordsjælland players
AC Horsens players
Nykøbing FC players
Danish Superliga players
Liga I players
Danish expatriate men's footballers
Expatriate footballers in Romania
Danish expatriate sportspeople in Romania
Footballers from Copenhagen